Chris Woodruff defeated Gustavo Kuerten in the final, 7–5, 4–6, 6–3 to win the men's singles tennis title at the 1997 Canadian Open.

Wayne Ferreira was the defending champion, but lost to Yevgeny Kafelnikov in the third round.

Seeds 
A champion seed is indicated in bold text while text in italics indicates the round in which that seed was eliminated.  The top eight seeds received a bye to the second round.

  Michael Chang (semifinals)
  Goran Ivanišević (third round)
  Thomas Muster (third round)
  Yevgeny Kafelnikov (semifinals)
  Thomas Enqvist (quarterfinals)
  Gustavo Kuerten (final)
  Mark Philippoussis (quarterfinals)
  Richard Krajicek (quarterfinals)
  Petr Korda (first round)
  Tim Henman (first round)
  Patrick Rafter (second round)
  Jonas Björkman (third round)
  Wayne Ferreira (third round)
  Jim Courier (first round)
  Alex O'Brien (third round)
  Jan Siemerink (second round)

Draw

Finals

Top half

Section 1

Section 2

Bottom half

Section 3

Section 4

External links 
 1997 du Maurier Open draw

Men's Singles